Lee Hye-gyeong (born 1960) is a South Korean writer who has published three collections of works and received multiple awards.

Life

In her first year of university, Lee was exposed to national political controversies including pictures from the 1980 Kwangju massacre, which caused her to drop out of college in 1985 to disguise herself as a worker and go to a factory. She began to read voraciously, debate social issues, and build a personal national consciousness.

Lee taught high school for two years before making her literary debut.

She often travels to remote and underdeveloped parts of the world, and served as a volunteer worker in Indonesia for two years.

Work

Lee is still considered an author in the new generation of women writers, whose careers are still evolving. Lee believes that she cannot write a single sentence about something she has not personally experienced and felt in the deepest core of her being. Her dependency on real experiences, which explains the small volume of her literary output, may be seen as an indication of a master craftsman or an amateurish approach towards writing; regardless of how she is viewed, however, Lee writes with utmost care and polish. Thematically, Lee’s works center on families in different stages of disintegration. Although she is a feminist writer deeply interested in women’s place in family and in society, Lee also departs significantly from the stereotypical feminist perspective of gender dichotomy. The fathers in her works are the oppressors as well as the oppressed powerless against their own “father figures”— society, tradition and conventions that crush them as much as they crush others. In this sense, women and men share the common burden of societal oppression.

Works in translation
 A House on the Road (길 위의 집)

Works in Korean (partial)
 A House on the Road (1995)
 In Front of That House (1998)
 Hilltop (2001)

Awards
 1995 Today's Writer Award for A House on the Road
 2000 Korea Daily Literature Prize for In Front of That House
 2002 Contemporary Literature (Hyundae Munhak) Award for Hilltop
 2006 Dong-in Literary Award for The Gap

References 

1960 births
Living people
South Korean writers